Baudissin is the name of a German noble family of Sorbian origin, first mentioned in 1326 in Upper Lusatia, now part of Saxony. At the time Bautzen, the district capital, was called Budissin, whence the name originated.
All name bearers, including those of family lines like Baudissin-Zinzendorf and Baudissin-Zinzendorf-Pottendorf, are Counts or Countesses.

History 
Wolf Heinrich von Baudissin married into a Rantzau noble family from Holstein and became the progenitor of all family members living today. From this time on most Baudissins settled in Holstein and other parts of Denmark and often served the Danish kings as diplomats, officers and administrators. His grandson Wulf Hinrich (1671–1748) was another military leader and was made a hereditary Imperial Count on 28 February 1741 by the prince-elector of Saxony, Duke Frederick Augustus II (King Augustus III of Poland), for his services and thus became the first Graf von Baudissin.

The family has since brought forth numerous diplomats, military and civil officers, administrators, advisers to kings and emperors, writers, artists, journalists and lawyers. The families Baudissin and their Danish branch of "Bauditz" are listed in joint entries in the 1909, 1911, 1915 and 1959 editions of the Danmarks Adels Aarbog ("Danish nobility yearbook").

Notable members 
 Adelbert Heinrich Graf von Baudissin (1820-1871), writer
 Wolf Heinrich von Baudissin (1579-1646), military leader
 Wolf Heinrich Graf von Baudissin (1789-1878), Danish and German diplomat, writer, and translator 
 Adalbert Heinrich Graf von Baudissin (1820–1871), journalist, war correspondent, writer, and publisher
 Wolf Ernst Hugo Emil Graf von Baudissin (1867–1926), officer and writer 
 Wolf Wilhelm Friedrich von Baudissin (1847–1927), theologian and Old Testament scholar
 Wolf Graf von Baudissin (1907-1993), German general and professor of International Peace Studies.

References

External links 
 www.baudissin.eu is a portal for further information and lists several personal homepages related to the Baudissins - in German 
 IFSH- the website of the Institute for Peace Research and Security Policy at the University of Hamburg of which former General Wolf Count von Baudissin was the founding director.

 
People from the Duchy of Holstein
Danish noble families
Bautzen